Scientific and Technological Advanced Research Laboratories (S.T.A.R. Labs) is a fictional scientific research facility and organization appearing in American comic books published by DC Comics. It first appeared in Superman #246 (December 1971) and was created by Len Wein and Curt Swan.

It is known for providing medical treatment to superheroes.

Publication history 
S.T.A.R. Labs was introduced in Superman #246 (December 1971). In the Superman comics, Professor Hamilton formerly worked there, and Dr. Kitty Faulkner, also known as the superheroine Rampage, is currently employed there.

The Metropolis location is featured in a battle and as a plot point in Armageddon 2001.

In Teen Titans, Cyborg's parents, Silas and Eleanor Stone, and his former love interest, Dr. Sarah Charles, all worked for S.T.A.R. Labs.

Past S.T.A.R. Labs employees are Murray Takamoto, Dr. Jenet Klyburn, Prof Dr. eL Mohammed and Dr. Albert Michaels (the first Atomic Skull). The character of Dr. Klyburn was based on the incoming president of DC Comics, Jenette Kahn.

The 1993 comics miniseries S.T.A.R. Corps was about a group of superhumans who had inadvertently gained their powers in a S.T.A.R. Labs experiment.

The organization is featured in the 1996 mini-series The Final Night. As eternal winter threatens the world, thanks to the Sun-Eater, S.T.A.R. Labs keeps their webpage updated with encouragement and various information related to the emergency.

S.T.A.R. Labs' San Francisco and Montana branches play an important role in JLA #110–114 (2005).

52 Aftermath: The Four Horsemen #1 (October 2007) shows a S.T.A.R. Labs relief operation working, side by side with Waynetech, in the devastated remains of the country of Bialya. All the relief workers are slain by outside forces.

The latter issues of DC Universe: Legacies showcase the life of Metropolis Star Labs security director Jim M.

Fictional history 

S.T.A.R. was founded by scientist Garrison Slate, who wanted a nationwide chain of research laboratories unconnected to the government or any business interests. He succeeded not only on a national scale, but an international one as well: S.T.A.R. Labs currently maintains facilities in Canada, Europe, Australia, and Japan as well as in the United States, with the total number of facilities numbering between twenty and thirty at last recorded count.

S.T.A.R. Labs is one of the companies providing sponsorship to the superhero team The Conglomerate, a firm of superheroes set up by Claire Montgomery, Maxwell Lord's ex as a rival to Justice League International. The other sponsors included American Steel, Dante Foods, Dupree Chemical, Ferris Aircraft, LexCorp, Ovel Oil, Pax Entertainment, Stagg Enterprises.

S.T.A.R.'s Detroit location assists in evacuation efforts of the world's coasts during an alien invasion. The same location is the workplace of Silas Stone, the father of Justice League's Cyborg.

The organization sets up shop in Oregon to assist with the rookie superhero Naomi. At this point they have lost some credibility with the Justice League.

Locations 
A partial list of some known locations of S.T.A.R. Labs facilities and their research focuses, where either is known, includes:
 Central City, Missouri, home of the Flash
 Chicago, Illinois, home of the second Blue Beetle
 Fawcett City: specializing in extraterrestrial research
 Gotham City: specializing in weaponry
 Keystone City, Kansas
 Metropolis (Queensland Park Borough, near Metropolis Harbor): specializing in marine biology
 Metropolis (central branch, New Troy Island): catch-all facility
 Star City branch specialized in dimensional travel.

S.T.A.R. Labs Staff
 Garrison Slate - Founder.
 Sarah Charles - Vic Stone's love interest and revealed in New 52, a graduate of University of Michigan.
 Dr. Kitty Faulkner - 
 Jenet Klyburn - Metropolis Branch 
 Murray Takamoto - 
 Valerie Perez -
 Christina McGee - 
 Kala Avasti - Ally to John Henry Irons.
 T. O. Morrow - Only in New 52.

Former 
 Elias Orr - Government agent in league, featured in Superman: For Tomorrow, Lex Luthor: Man of Steel and led the Cyborg Revenge Squad.
 Albert Michaels - Chief Administrator, later known as Atomic Skull.
 Silas Stone and Elinore Stone - Scientist parents to Victor Stone/Cyborg. Silas is head of STAR Labs and operator of Red Room in New 52 that saves Vic's life.
 Emil Hamilton - Ex employee who suffered mental break.
 Jason Rusch - Half of Firestorm.
 Rudy Jones - Ex janitor, became Parasite.

Other versions

Earth One
In Teen Titans: Earth One continuity, S.T.A.R. Labs are the main antagonistic force behind the creation of the Titans. Members include Silas Stone, Elinore Stone, Joshua Clay, Larry Trainor, and Niles Caulder with Deathstroke and Jericho/Joseph are their enforcers.

In other media

Television

Animated 
 S.T.A.R. Labs is shown in the Superman episode "The Hunter".
 S.T.A.R. Labs is mentioned in the episode "Nothing to Fear" of Batman: The Animated Series. It was one of 5 locations in Gotham City that Scarecrow's mask could have been manufactured. 
 In Superman: The Animated Series, S.T.A.R. Labs and scientist Professor Hamilton made regular appearances as a source of information and equipment for Superman. In addition to housing Kryptonite rocks under lock and key, S.T.A.R. custodian Rudy Jones was transformed into the monstrous Parasite during an attempt to steal hazardous materials. The episode "Two's a Crowd" featured a scientist named Earl Garver who stole isotopes which he made into a bomb until he was stopped by Superman.
 S.T.A.R. Labs made appearances in Justice League Unlimited.
 S.T.A.R. Labs was also mentioned in the Teen Titans cartoon, as the makers of the "Maximum 7", a microchip Cyborg uses to upgrade himself in the episode "Overdrive".
 S.T.A.R. Labs is also featured in the animated series Krypto the Superdog; it has an unintentional hand in creating Streaky the Supercat and Stretch-O-Mutt.
 A van that has "S.T.A.R. LABS" written on it can be seen at the end of the Batman: The Brave and the Bold episode "Invasion of the Secret Santas." Masked men from S.T.A.R. Labs are loading the remains of Red Tornado into it to be repaired. In "The Color of Revenge," an S.T.A.R. Labs facility in Bludhaven is later attacked by Crazy Quilt when he comes to steal the Stimulated Emission Light Amplifier. A group of bound and gagged S.T.A.R. scientists briefly appear, but have no lines.
 A S.T.A.R. Labs facility appears in the Young Justice episode "Infiltrator". The facility is raided and destroyed by the Swarm, a cloud of dangerous nanites used by the League of Shadows. In "Misplaced," Klarion the Witch Boy, Wotan, Blackbriar Thorn, Felix Faust and Wizard's spell that split the Earth into the kids dimension and the adults dimension enabled a diversion for Riddler and Sportsmaster to steal an organism (which resembles a part of Starro) from S.T.A.R. Labs. It is brought before Brain during his meeting with the other members of The Light (Project Cadmus' Board of Directors) as Brain tells Klarion the Witch Boy that they plan to bring it "into the Light." The only known members of S.T.A.R. Labs in this continuity are Adam Strange and Eduardo Dorado.
 S.T.A.R. Labs makes several appearances in Justice League Action. It also functions as a prison as Solomon Grundy was incarcerated here.
 S.T.A.R. Labs makes a minor appearance in Harley Quinn, wherein it gets robbed by the title character and her crew.
 S.T.A.R. Labs appears in the DC Super Hero Girls episode "#NightmareInGotham".

Live action 
 In the 1990 series The Flash, Dr. Christina "Tina" McGee (Amanda Pays), the scientist who helps Barry Allen (John Wesley Shipp) deal with the super-speed that makes him The Flash, works for S.T.A.R. Labs in Central City.
 In Lois & Clark: The New Adventures of Superman, S.T.A.R. Labs was often mentioned as a source of scientific information. It gained more prominence with the introduction of S.T.A.R. scientist Dr. Bernard Klein as a recurring character from the third season onwards. Dallas City Hall doubles as S.T.A.R. Labs' building exterior for long shots during the series.
 In Smallville, Winslow Schott is a former scientific inventor of S.T.A.R. Labs who was hired by Oliver Queen to work for Queen Industries. It is later revealed that S.T.A.R. Labs (short for Swann Technology And Research Labs) was founded by Virgil Swann (Christopher Reeve). S.T.A.R. Labs is run by Dr. Emil Hamilton.
 S.T.A.R. Labs appears as a major location in the Arrowverse.
 It is first mentioned over the second season of Arrow in the news watched by the characters. In the episode "State v. Queen", the Count (Seth Gabel) bounces his broadcast signal through a S.T.A.R. Labs satellite in order to hide his location. The first time it is mentioned by a character is during the episode "Three Ghosts", when Barry Allen (Grant Gustin), having helped Oliver Queen thwart one of Sebastian Blood's schemes in Starling City, returns to his home of Central City, only to be simultaneously hit by both lightning and an explosion caused by the meltdown of S.T.A.R. Labs's particle accelerator and rendered comatose for nine months. Later, in "The Man Under the Hood", S.T.A.R. scientists Caitlin Snow (Danielle Panabaker) and Cisco Ramon (Carlos Valdes) are recruited by Felicity Smoak (Emily Bett Rickards) to synthesize a cure to Mirakuru drug using a blood sample. The villain Deathstroke (Manu Bennett) also attacks S.T.A.R. Labs in the same episode on the hunt for some equipment.
 S.T.A.R. Labs returns in the 2014 series The Flash. Following the events of the second season of Arrow, Barry awakens from his coma and learns that he has gained super speed. He joins forces with Caitlin, Cisco, S.T.A.R. founder Harrison Wells (Tom Cavanagh), and his adoptive father Joe West (Jesse L. Martin) to combat individuals who were also affected by the particle accelerator explosion (dubbed metahumans) but are using their newfound abilities for nefarious purposes, using S.T.A.R. Labs as a primary base of operations and reappropriating the old particle accelerator as a makeshift prison for them. It is revealed throughout the events of the first season that Eobard Thawne (Cavanagh/Matt Letscher), who had been masquerading as Wells, had engineered the explosion to give Barry his powers and groomed him into becoming the Flash in order to use Barry to return to his original time in the future. In the second season, Barry, having defeated Eobard, is given ownership of S.T.A.R. Labs by Eobard through his will. However, Team Flash discover that a breach to parallel worlds has appeared in S.T.A.R. Labs as a result of the events of the first season, and through it they meet Jay Garrick (Teddy Sears) and a second Harrison Wells, who have come to stop the villainous Zoom, a murderous speedster from their world (dubbed "Earth-2") who plans to steal Barry's speed for himself. The second season also introduces the S.T.A.R. Labs of Earth-2, which was also responsible for creating the metahumans. Wells, Barry and Cisco briefly reside there with the intention of closing the breaches between the two Earths in order to trap Zoom in Earth-2, but they are forced to evacuate when Zoom attacks the building. The third season introduces a new room called the "Speed Lab", an exercise chamber for Barry and other speedsters that was created as a result of Barry creating a new timeline. It also introduces a third S.T.A.R. Labs on Earth-19 whose Harrison Wells is recruited by the team. Unlike the S.T.A.R. Labs of other Earths, however, its leading scientific mind is not Wells but instead his partner, Randolf Morgan (Adam Bergquist), whose work Wells often claims credit for. During his time on Earth-1, the Earth-19 Wells begins the process of converting S.T.A.R. Labs into a museum. In a flash-forward shown during the fifth-season episode "The Death of Vibe", it is shown that between 2018 and 2024, the Flash Museum would be inaugurated in the same building as the S.T.A.R. Labs, with Mr. Myles becoming its curator.
S.T.A.R. Labs makes multiple appearances in the 2019 series Doom Patrol, notably in the first-season episode "Donkey Patrol" recalling Cyborg's origin and in the second-season episode "Space Patrol" where Cyborg discovers S.T.A.R. Labs had a hand in his girlfriend Roni Ever's prosthetics.
S.T.A.R. Labs make an appearance in the Naomi episode "Homecoming".
S.T.A.R. Labs make an appearance in the Titans episode "Lex Luthor".

Film

Animated 
 S.T.A.R. Labs makes an appearance in Justice League: Doom.  After Superman is shot by a Kryptonite bullet, the Flash is sent to a S.T.A.R. Labs facility in Kyoto, Japan, where they are making a Kryptonite scalpel (this being the only tool that could allow doctors to operate and remove the bullet). The scalpel ends up being unnecessary, as Batman has Cyborg use his blaster filtered through a piece of Kryptonite crystal to serve as a cutting laser and Martian Manhunter uses his shape-shifting abilities to remove the bullet.
 In Justice League: The Flashpoint Paradox, Superman tells Batman and Flash that he will take Professor Zoom to S.T.A.R. Labs after they successfully remove Zoom's 25th century bombs off the Rogues. However, this version of S.T.A.R Labs appears to be in the Watchtower after Superman is seen taking Professor Zoom towards the sky.
 S.T.A.R. Labs first makes an appearance in Justice League: War with New 52 staff like Silas Stone, Sarah Charles, and T.O. Morrow. When Victor Stone goes there after a football game to confront his father as to his absence during the game. Captain Marvel later returns several Parademons to S.T.A.R Labs through the hole in the roof shortly after the creation of Cyborg. It is shown again at the end of the movie while it is under repair.
 S.T.A.R. Labs makes several appearances in Justice League: Throne of Atlantis where it is being used as a headquarters for the Justice League, albeit with the group's original name The Super Seven, much to Steve Trevor's annoyance. This is later corrected at the end of the movie with the name Justice League above the HQ Doors.
 S.T.A.R. Labs appears in Teen Titans Go! To the Movies. Slade infiltrates into the laboratory to steal the Kryptonian crystal. While the Teen Titans try to stop Slade, he easily escapes because the Titans are not serious enough.

Live action 
 In Man of Steel, S.T.A.R. Labs has a cameo appearance through the film's climax amongst the Metropolis skyline.
 In Batman v Superman: Dawn of Justice, S.T.A.R. Labs appears in video obtained by Bruce Wayne from a LexCorp drive and emailed to Diana Prince. In the Ultimate Edition, Jena Malone appears as Jenet Klyburn in a separate role as a weapons expert and ballistics specialist assisting Lois Lane.
 S.T.A.R. Labs appears once again in Justice League. Silas Stone, Cyborg's father, is S.T.A.R. Labs' head and the lead scientist conducting the research on the crashed Kryptonian ship, as well as the research on the their Mother Box. Silas and other S.T.A.R. Labs personnel are kidnapped by the film's villain, Steppenwolf, and later rescued. In the Director's Cut of the film, Silas works alongside Dr. Ryan Choi, who takes over as the lead scientist after Silas' death after marking to Box allowing the Justice League to track it.
 In The Suicide Squad, Abner Krill/Polka-Dot Man details his backstory: His mother was a S.T.A.R. Labs scientist obsessed with making her children superheroes, resulting in Abner suffering from an inter-dimensional virus, and Post-traumatic stress disorder where he envisions other people as his mother.

Video games 
 S.T.A.R. Labs is featured in the video game Justice League Heroes. Superman and Batman travel to S.T.A.R. Labs to fight Brainiac and his robotic minions housing a telepathic Apokoliptian meteorite and Kryptonian DNA. After Brainiac is defeated, Superman and Batman discover it is only a clone of Brainiac.
 S.T.A.R. Labs is featured in DC Universe Online. In the hero campaign, the players can gain the trust of S.T.A.R. Labs personnel by completing certain missions, collecting specific bounties, and gain access to equipment from S.T.A.R. Labs Vendors. An old S.T.A.R. Labs building can be seen in downtown Metropolis, where villainous players are enlisted to help Gorilla Grodd reclaim his technology confiscated by S.T.A.R. Labs troops and defeat both the original Flash and the current Flash. There is also a S.T.A.R. Labs building in the Otisburg section of Gotham City. S.T.A.R. Labs' soldiers consist of S.T.A.R. Labs Heavy Troopers, S.T.A.R. Labs Security Guards, and S.T.A.R. Labs Shock Troopers.
 Injustice: Gods Among Us has a stage titled Insurgency, which is inspired by S.T.A.R. Labs' facilities and is used by Batman. A section of the game called "S.T.A.R. Labs Missions" is present.
 S.T.A.R. Labs appears in the Metropolis section of the hub world in Lego DC Super-Villains. It resembles the Arrowverse version with a Cosmic Treadmill and red/yellow interior.

Web series 
S.T.A.R. Labs have a cameo appearance in DC Super Hero Girls.

See also 
 LexCorp
 S.T.A.R. Corps
 Wayne Enterprises

References

External links 
S.T.A.R. Labs at Titans Tower

Fictional elements introduced in 1971
Central City (DC Comics)
Gotham City
Metropolis (comics)
Fictional hospitals
1971 in comics